Sociedad Deportiva Huesca, S.A.D., is a Spanish football club in Huesca, in the autonomous community of Aragon. Founded on 29 March 1960, SD Huesca plays in the Segunda División, having played in the Spanish top division for the first time in the club's history in the 2018–19 season, followed by another single season in 2020–21. SD Huesca plays its home games at Estadio El Alcoraz, which seats 9,100 spectators.

History
The city of Huesca is one of the pioneers in the introduction of football in Aragon. In the beginning of the 20th century (1903) the city already had a society named Foot-ball Oscense.

Huesca Fútbol Club was founded in 1910 with Jorge Cajal as the first president. On 10 April 1910 the first formal match was played in the city of Huesca between the teams of the Sertorius Club, formed by high school students, and El Ideal de Magisterio Oscense. The match was organized by Huesca Sport Club.

In 1913, Huesca Sport Club became Huesca Fútbol Club. At this time other teams also emerged, among them Atlético Osca and the Stadium, which later merged with Huesca FC. The Stadium wore blue and red colors of Barcelona and the team acquired those colors for their T-shirts.

16 years later it folded – after it had joined the Royal Spanish Football Federation in 1922 (its department in the Aragon autonomous community in Spain - the Aragonese Football Federation, founded in 1922). But in 1929 reappeared as CD Huesca, being renamed Unión Deportiva in 1943, but the club again disappeared in 1956 due to financial problems. The first president after official registration of the Huesca Fútbol Club was Santos Solana. Lorenzo Lera was the first associate of the club, which was enrolled in the Federation with the blaugrana colours as its founding members were FC Barcelona supporters.

One of the first games of written reference was a local derby against Bosco FC, a 3–5 loss. In the mid-1920s the club turned professional and, in 1926, a match against FC Barcelona was played at the Villa Isabel, in a 2–2 draw. Following the serious incidents that occurred on 23 October 1927 in the match against Real Zaragoza in the Regional Championship, with a field invasion by fans due to lousy arbitration and consequent sanctions of the Regional Federation for three months, the club was withdrawn from the championship and passed its players to other teams. In early 1930s emerged the Huesca Sports Club (Club Deportivo Huesca) which won the Regional Fans Championship (Campeonato Regional de Aficionados) in the 1930–31 season, reaching the final of the National Championship, where lost to Ciosvín in the Estadio Chamartín in Madrid. During the Civil War, football was still played in Huesca and in 1939 the Huesca Fútbol Club instantly reappeared. From the 1943–44 season and after being renamed to Unión Deportiva Huesca the club played for seven consecutive seasons in Tercera División. In 1950, Huesca first reached Segunda División.

On 29 March 1960 Sociedad Deportiva Huesca evolved, first playing in Segunda División B in 1977. The 1960–61 season Huesca played in Regional category and achieved promotion to Tercera División, where remained for 12 consecutive seasons.

In the 1972–73 season the club was relegated to Primera Regional, which is a regional level competition. But the next year it returned to Tercera División. The club headed Tercera División in the 1989–90 season and as a result was promoted to Segunda División B.

In the 2005–06 season, SD Huesca was relegated to Tercera División. In 2006 the club finished second in the Copa Federación de España, losing to Puertollano; in that same season it narrowly avoided relegation to Tercera División, after a play-off against Castillo.

In the 2006–07 campaign the club reached the play-offs for promotion to the second level, having lost a two-legged final against Córdoba CF. In the following season, it returned to the "silver category". It happened on 15 September 2008 after the win over Écjija in the promotion play-off.

2008–09's second division was a regular one for Huesca led by coach Antonio Calderón, with the new league status being maintained with many rounds left. Huesca finished that season in the 11th position. Rubén Castro, loaned by Deportivo La Coruña, was one of the most important players during the campaign, scoring 14 times, ninth-best in the league. In its second season in the Segunda División, the team struggled to remain there. Huesca finished in 13th position, just 2 points away from being relegated. The best scorer in the team that season was Juanjo Camacho, who scored 8 goals in the competition.

In the 2010–11 season Huesca retained its place in the Segunda División finishing in the 14th position. The result was achieved by the good defensive performance. The goalkeeper Andrés Fernández was awarded with the Zamora Trophy for having the lowest "goals-to-games" ratio in the division.

Relegation followed at the end of the 2012–13 season, but the club returned to the Segunda División in 2015 after a first-place finish and eventually a two-leg play-off victory over Huracán Valencia.

After the 2016–17 season, Huesca qualified for the promotion play-offs to La Liga for the first time ever, but was eliminated in the semifinals by Getafe. The azulgranas managed to play 2:2 at home, but then lost 0:3 in the away game. In the 2017–18 season, Huesca was promoted to La Liga for the first time in their history after winning 2–0 against Lugo on 21 May 2018 at the Anxo Carro stadium.
On 4 May 2019, Huesca was relegated back to the Segunda División after only one season in La Liga.

Huesca won promotion back to La Liga on 17 July 2020, after a 3–0 win over Numancia and secured the league title on the last matchday. On 22 May 2021, despite winning two of their last five fixtures of the 2020–21 season, the club was relegated back to the second tier once more after drawing 0–0 on the last matchday against Valencia, the same team who had beaten them 6–2 to cause their relegation two years earlier. A month later, the club had its first Spanish international, goalkeeper Álvaro Fernández, who stepped in along with his under-21 teammates after the senior squad became unavailable due to a COVID-19 case.

Season to season

 2 seasons in La Liga
 11 seasons in Segunda División
 16 seasons in Segunda División B
 30 seasons in Tercera División

Stadium

During the 1971–72 season Huesca decided to build a new football stadium, Estadio El Alcoraz, the team's third in its history, located in the hills of San Jorge with a capacity of 9,100 seats. The 1974 Amateur Cup of Spain final took place there.

Training facilities
Name: Ciudad Deportiva San Jorge
Size: 100 x 64 m.
Grass: Artificial (since 2005)
Address: Extension Ricardo del Arco, s / n. – Phone: 974 24 29 25

Current squad
.

Reserve team

Out on loan

Club officials

Current technical staff 

 Jorge Carracedo

Board of directors 
{| class="wikitable"
|-
!Office
!Name
|-
| President
| Agustín Lasaosa
|-
| Secretary
| Pedro Ibaibarriaga
|-
|rowspan=7| Directors
| José Abarca
|-
| Sergio Alfonso
|-
| Carmelo Bosque
|-
| Sergio Gracia
|-
| José Antonio Martín
|-
| Agustín Pueyo
|-
| Manuel Torres
|-
| General director
| Jose Luis Ortas
|-
| Documentation secretary
| Maite Franco
|-
| Projects and resources department
| Luis Sanclemente
|-
| Sporting director
| Emilio Vega
|-
| Academy director
| Ramón Tejada
|-
| Women's team director
| Azucena Garanto
|-
| Medical director
| Juan Carlos Galindo
|-
| Infrastructure and production director
| Luis Sanclemente
|-
| Financial director
| Carlos Laguna
|-
| Marketing and commercial director
| Daniel Oliván
|-
| Operations and services director
| Agustín Pueyo
|-
| Communication director
| Jara Echeverría
|-
| Digital development director
| Azucena Garant

Coaches

See also
AD Almudévar
CD Teruel
SD Ejea
SD Huesca B
Aragonese derby

References

External links

Official website 
Futbolme team profile 
BDFutbol team profile

 
Football clubs in Aragon
SD Huesca
La Liga clubs
Association football clubs established in 1960
SD Huesca
Segunda División clubs